The 10th Marine Regiment is an artillery regiment of the United States Marine Corps based at Marine Corps Base Camp Lejeune, North Carolina.  They fall under the command of the 2nd Marine Division and the II Marine Expeditionary Force.

Subordinate units
Headquarters Battery, 10th Marines

1st Battalion, 10th Marines (1/10)

2nd Battalion, 10th Marines (2/10)

3rd Battalion, 10th Marines (3/10) was disbanded on 26 April 2013.

4th Battalion, 10th Marines (4/10) was disbanded.

5th Battalion, 10th Marines (5/10) was disbanded on 1 June 2012.

Mission
Provide fires in support of 2nd Marine Division using organic indirect fire assets while coordinating both lethal and non-lethal fires from other II Marine Expeditionary Force fire support agencies in order to suppress, neutralize or destroy the enemy.

History

Early years
10th Marines was originally formed in Quantico, Virginia on 25 April 1914 as an artillery battalion under the 1st Marine Brigade. As a battalion, the unit took part in conflicts in Haiti and the Dominican Republic from August 1915 to May 1917. The battalion was expanded throughout mid-1917 and finally, on 15 January 1917 the unit was re-designated as the 10th Marine Regiment of Field Artillery.

Between World War I and II, the Regiment filled many different roles, including building their Barracks and various other construction around the base, and guarding the mail.  It even participated in annual reenactments of Civil War battles. During this same time, the regiment was deployed to China and to Iceland just prior to American involvement in World War II.

World War II
During the War the Regiment was involved in the assault on Guadalcanal and later took part in the bloody battles of Tarawa, Saipan, Tinian and Okinawa.

After World War II
After the end of World War II, the 10th Marines found themselves at Camp Lejeune, North Carolina, which would be their home until present day. As the Korean War started, the 10th Marines were working with a skeleton crew, but five months later they were fully mobilized and back up to wartime strength and ready to fight. Again, during the Cuban Missile Crisis, they were mobilized to participate in the blockade of Cuba.

Modern-Day Activities

Since the end of the Korean War, that time the Regiment has participated in exercises testing the methods of firing 155mm howitzers from landing craft, as well as the biannual Fire Exercise at Fort Bragg, North Carolina. The Regiment has also continuously sent firing batteries and battalions to train in Okinawa; and to participate in CAX, a desert training operation held at Twenty-Nine Palms, California on the edge of the Mojave Desert; and to northern Norway in support of NATO training exercises.

First Gulf War
In January 1990, the Regiment deployed to Saudi Arabia in support of Operation Desert Shield.  The Regiment was tasked with providing fire support for the 2nd Marine Division in the war to oust Iraqi forces from occupied Kuwait.

Global War on Terrorism
10th Marines deployed to Kuwait in early 2003 and provided fire support for Task Force Tarawa during the 2003 Invasion of Iraq. Since 2003, the Regiment has continued to deploy battalion headquarters units and their subordinate batteries to Iraq to provide fire support and sometimes also act as provisional rifle companies especially in the Al Anbar province of western part of the country. Units of the regiment also continued to deploy to Afghanistan in support of Operation Enduring Freedom.

Unit Awards
Presidential Unit Citation with 1 Bronze Star

Navy Unit Commendation

Asiatic Pacific Campaign Medal with 4 Bronze Stars

World War II Victory Medal

World War II Navy of Occupation Medal

See also

 List of United States Marine Corps regiments
 Organization of the United States Marine Corps

References
Notes

Bibliography
 

Web

 10th Marines official website

10
10
10th Marine
United States Marine Corps in World War II
Military units and formations established in 1914
10th Marine
1914 establishments in Virginia